Omruduiyeh may refer to:
 Omruduiyeh, Bezenjan (امرودوييه - Omrūdūīyeh)
 Omruduiyeh, Dehsard (عمرودوئيه - ‘Omrūdū’īyeh)